Saint-Amand-en-Puisaye (literally Saint-Amand in Puisaye) is a commune in the Nièvre department in central France. Its sights include the Château de Saint-Amand-en-Puisaye, a representative work of French Renaissance architecture.

See also
Communes of the Nièvre department

References

Communes of Nièvre